This is a list of people associated to Leiden University, including alumni as well as people who have taught or studied at Leiden University.

A 
 Piet Aalberse, politician
 Nasr Hamid Abu Zayd, theologian
 John Quincy Adams, 6th President of the United States
 Princess Aimée of Orange-Nassau, van Vollenhoven-Söhngen
 Nebahat Albayrak, politician
 Johannes Alberti, theologian
 Bernhard Siegfried Albinus, anatomist
 Alexander, Prince of Orange
 Josette Altmann Borbón, First Lady of Costa Rica 1994–1998
 Tinde van Andel, ethnobotanist
 Princess Anita of Orange-Nassau, van Vollenhoven-van Eijk
 Sophia Antoniadis, first female professor at Leiden
 Ayaan Hirsi Ali, activist
 János Apáczai Csere, mathematician
 Jacobus Arminius, theologian
 Tobias Asser, Nobel laureate (Peace 1911)  
 Jimly Asshiddiqie, 1st Chief Justice of the Constitutional Court of Indonesia
 Touraj Atabaki, academic

B 
 Caspar Barlaeus, theologian
 Johann Bartsch, physician
 Beatrix, Former Queen of the Netherlands
 Johann Peter Berg, German Protestant theologian, historian, and Orientalist
 Alexander Johan Berman, theologian and literary critic
 Joost Berman, lawyer, judge and poet
 Kune Biezeveld, theologian
 C. Jouco Bleeker, scholar of religion
 Nicolaas Bloembergen, Nobel laureate (Physics 1981) 
 Thomas Blondeau, novelist
 Herman Boerhaave, physician
 Herman Bavinck, theologian
 Bart Bok, astronomer
 Frits Bolkestein, Netherlands Deputy Prime Minister 2005–06
 Gerardus Johannes Petrus Josephus Bolland, philosopher
 Ben Bot, politician
 Alexander Boswell, judge
 Rolf Bremmer, academic
 Laurens Jan Brinkhorst, politician
 Thomas Browne, writer
 Sebald Justinus Brugmans, botanist
 Ian Buruma, writer
 Kofi Abrefa Busia, Prime Minister of Ghana 1969–72
 Ditmir Bushati, Albanian politician
 John Stuart, 3rd Earl of Bute, U.K. Prime Minister 1762–63
 Paulus Buys, Grand Pensionary of Holland 1572–84
 Boediono, Vice President of Indonesia

C 
 Archibald Cameron, Jacobite physician
 Hendrik Casimir, physicist
 Lisa Cheng, Chair Professor of Linguistics
 Carolus Clusius, botanist
 Jacques Cohen, embryologist
 Job Cohen, politician
 Prince Constantijn of the Netherlands
 Jodocus Crull, miscellaneous writer
 Petrus Cunaeus, academic
 Janus Henricus Donker Curtius,  last Opperhoofd of the Dutch trading post in Japan (1852–1855)

D 
 Baron d'Holbach, philosopher
 Charles Ruijs de Beerenbrouck, Netherlands Prime Minister 1918–25, 1929–33
 Michiel Jan de Goeje, orientalist
 Geertruida de Haas-Lorentz, physicist
 Jaap de Hoop Scheffer, 11th Secretary-General of NATO
 Pieter de la Court, economist
 René Descartes, philosopher and mathematician
 Willem de Sitter, physicist
 Gijs de Vries, politician
 Jouke de Vries, academic
 Hendrik de Wit, botanist
 Johan de Witt, Grand Pensionary of Holland 1653–72
 Tim de Zeeuw, astronomer
 Nicolaas Diederichs, President of South Africa 1975–78
 René Diekstra, psychologist
Kanta Dihal, research scientist and author
 Edsger W. Dijkstra, computer scientist
 Djumhana Wiriaatmadja, Prime Minister of Pasundan 1949–1950
 Volkert Doeksen, CEO
 Ana Dolidze, lawyer
 Janus Dousa, statesman
 Otto Duintjer, philosopher

E 
 Paul Ehrenfest, physicist
 Willem Einthoven, Nobel laureate (Medicine 1924) 
 Albert Einstein, Nobel laureate (Physics 1921) 
 Willem Anthony Engelbrecht, jurist and colonial administrator
 Simon Episcopius, theologian
 Paul Sophus Epstein, physicist

F 
 Enrico Fermi, Nobel laureate (Physics 1938) 
 Henry Fielding, novelist
 Horst Fischer, lawyer
 Paul Fleming, poet
 Prince Floris of Orange-Nassau
 Justin Fox (born 1964), American financial journalist, commentator, and writer
 John Lauder, Lord Fountainhall, jurist
 Prince Frederick of the Netherlands
 Frederick William, Elector of Brandenburg

G 
 Richard D. Gill, professor of mathematical statistics
 Thomas Girdlestone, physician
 Franciscus Gomarus, theologian
 Samuel Goudsmit, physicist
 Andries Cornelis Dirk de Graeff, diplomat, statesman
 Jacob Dircksz de Graeff, politician, burgomaster of Amsterdam 
 Johann Georg Graevius, academic
 Christian Greco, Egyptologist
 Richard T. Griffiths, historian
 Jane Grogan, immunologist and cancer researcher
 Jacobus Gronovius, academic
 Hugo Grotius, jurist

H 
 Hendrik Jacob Hamaker, jurist
 Sri Sultan Hamengkubuwono IX, Vice-President of Indonesia 1973–78
 Mohammad Hatta, First Vice President of Indonesia
 David Hartley (the Younger), politician
 Erik Hazelhoff Roelfzema, writer, resistance fighter, RAF pilot
 Daniel Heinsius, scholar
 Tiberius Hemsterhuis, philologist
 Paul Hermann, botanist and physician
 Felienne Hermans, computer scientist
 Johannes Hevelius, astronomer and jurist
 Nina den Heyer, politician in Bonaire
 Rosalyn Higgins, President of the International Court of Justice
 George Howe (physician), Scottish physician active in London; Fellow of the Royal College of Physicians
 Johannes Hudde, politician and mathematician
 Johan Huizinga, historian
 Christiaan Huygens, mathematician and physicist
 Constantijn Huygens, Jr., statesman

I 
 Michael Ignatieff, Canadian politician

J 
 Maarten Jansen, academic
 Marius Jeuken, theoretical biologist
 Ernst de Jonge, lawyer, Olympic rower, resistance fighter
 Stefanie Joosten, actress and model 
 Queen Juliana of the Netherlands

K 
 Heike Kamerlingh Onnes, Nobel laureate (Physics 1913) 
 Johan Hendrik Caspar Kern, linguist
 Ko Kwat Tiong, lawyer, politician, Indonesian nationalist and civil servant
 Theodorus Klompe, geologist
 Pieter Kooijmans, judge of the International Court of Justice
 Ton Koopman, conductor
 Tjalling Charles Koopmans, Nobel laureate (Economics 1975) 
Maarten Kossmann, linguist who specializes in Berber languages.
Hugo Krabbe, jurist and legal philosopher
 Hendrik Anthony Kramers, physicist
 Dirk Willem van Krevelen, chemical engineer and scientist
 Abraham Kuijper, theologian and politician (Prime Minister 1901–05)
 Aert H. Kuipers, linguist
 Erik Kwakkel, codicologist

L 
 Jona Lendering, historian
 Hendrik Lenstra, mathematician
 Justus Lipsius, philologist
 J. H. A. Lokin, jurist
 Hendrik Antoon Lorentz, Nobel laureate (Physics 1902)

M 
 Peter Mair, political scientist
 Princess Margriet of the Netherlands
 Paul-Henri Marron, French Reformed pastor
 Alireza Mashaghi, physicist
 Eric Mazur, physicist
 Richard Mead, physician
 Jeroen Mettes, essayist and poet
 Victor Muller, CEO

N 
 William Frederick, Prince of Nassau-Dietz

O 
 Jan Hendrik Oort, astronomer
 Ivo Opstelten, politician
 Cornelis Ouwehand, anthropologist

P 
 Nathan Paget, Puritan physician
 Peter Simon Pallas, zoologist
 Antonie Pannekoek, astronomer and political theorist
 Senarath Paranavithana, archaeologist and epigraphist 
 Thomas Parker, minister and scholar
 Alexander Pechtold, Dutch politician
 Perizonius, scholar
 Phoa Liong Gie, Indonesian jurist, politician and newspaper owner
 Frank N. Pieke, cultural anthropologist
 Nicolaas Gerard Pierson, Netherlands Prime Minister 1897–1901
 Theodoor Gautier Thomas Pigeaud, academic
 Archibald Pitcairne, physician
 Ronald Plasterk, scientist and politician
 Prijono, politician

R 
 Hans Ras, academic
 Caspar Georg Carl Reinwardt, botanist
 Caspar Reuvens, archaeologist
 John Robinson, Pilgrim Fathers pastor
 Wil Roebroeks, archaeologist
 Olaus Rudbeck, scientist and university rector
 David Ruhnken, scholar
 Mark Rutte, Netherlands Prime Minister

S 
 Ali Sastroamidjojo, Prime Minister of Indonesia
 Joseph Justus Scaliger, theologian and scholar
 Henry G. Schermers, jurist
 Edith Schippers, politician
 Rutger Jan Schimmelpenninck, Grand Pensionary of Holland 1805–6
 Gerard Schouw, politician
 William Sherard, botanist
 Boudewijn Sirks, academic
 Jan Six, politician
 Willebrord Snell, astronomer
 Rudolph Snellius, mathematician and linguist
 Christiaan Snouck Hurgronje, orientalist
 Achmad Soebardjo, diplomat
 Soenario, politician
 Soetan Sjahrir, Prime Minister of Indonesia 1945–47
 Andreas Sparman, 17th-century Swedish court physician and author
 Myles Standish, military leader
 Jan Steen, painter
 Miep Stegmann, first woman psychiatrist in Belgium
 Simon Stevin, engineer, scientist
 Martinus Theunis Steyn, lawyer, Orange Free State president 
 Pieter Steyn, Grand Pensionary of Holland 1749–72
 Dirk Jan Struik, mathematician
 Franciscus Sylvius, physician and scientist
 Albert Szent-Györgyi, Nobel laureate (Medicine 1937)

T 
 Morris Tabaksblat, CEO
 Igor Tamm, Nobel laureate (Physics 1958) 
 Paul-Peter Tak, immunologist
 Julius Terpstra, politician
 Johan Rudolf Thorbecke, Netherlands Prime Minister 1871–72
 Jan Tinbergen, Nobel laureate (Economics 1969) 
 Nikolaas Tinbergen, Nobel laureate (Medicine 1973) 
 Isaac Titsingh, surgeon, scholar, merchant-trader and ambassador (Law 1765)
 Jaana Toivari-Viitala, egyptologist and chair of the Finnish Egyptology Society
 Nicolaes Tulp, surgeon and politician

U 
 Christianus Cornelius Uhlenbeck, linguist and anthropologist

V 
 Coenraad van Beuningen, diplomat
 Armin van Buuren, musician
 Ludolph van Ceulen, mathematician
 Jan Kappeyne van de Coppello, Netherlands Prime Minister 1877–79
 Marcel R.M. van den Brink, oncologist and medical researcher
 Johannes van den Driesche, theologian
 Adriaen van der Donck, lawyer
 Lousewies van der Laan, politician
 Max van der Stoel, politician
 Bram van der Stok, aviator
 Johannes Diderik van der Waals, Nobel laureate (Physics 1910) 
 Thomas van Erpe, orientalist
 Melanie Schultz van Haegen, politician
 Gerrit Jan van Heuven Goedhart, Nobel laureate (Peace 1954) 
 Gijsbert Karel van Hogendorp, Netherlands Prime Minister 1813–14
 Egbert van Kampen, mathematician
 Pieter van Musschenbroek, scientist
 Rembrandt van Rijn, painter
 Jacobus Henricus van 't Hoff, Nobel laureate (Chemistry 1901) 
 Cornelis van Vollenhoven, academic
 Pieter van Vollenhoven, royalty
 Ronald Venetiaan, Surinam President
 Maxime Verhagen, Netherlands Deputy Prime Minister
 Paul Verhoeven, film director
 Marjolijn Verspoor, linguist
 Gisbertus Voetius, theologian
 Thomas von der Dunk, historian
 Gerhard Johann Vossius, theologian

W 
 Wilhelmina, Queen of the Netherlands 1890–1948
 John Wilkes, politician
 William I, Prince of Orange, royalty
 Willem-Alexander, Prince of Orange, King of the Netherlands
 Willem Witteveen, legal scholar and politician
 William III of England, King of England 1689–1702

Z 
 Pieter Zeeman, Nobel laureate (Physics 1902) 
 Petrus Josephus Zoetmulder, academic
 Ben Zonneveld, botanist
 Han Zuilhof, chemist

See also
 List of rectores magnifici of Leiden University

References 

 
 
Leiden University